Eleanor of Blois or Champagne (French: Eléonore; 1102–1147) was a French noblewoman.

Life 
She was daughter of Stephen, Count of Blois and Adela of Normandy, daughter of William the Conqueror and Matilda of Flanders. Eleanor married Ralph I, Count of Vermandois.

Eleanor's marriage with Ralph was dissolved at the request of Eleanor of Aquitaine, whose sister, Petronilla of Aquitaine, was in love with Ralph. This led to a war with Theobald II of Champagne, who was Eleanor's brother. The war lasted two years (1142–1144) and ended with the occupation of Champagne by the royal army. Eleanor died in 1147.

References

1104 births
1147 deaths
12th-century French people
12th-century French women
House of Blois